Boris Begović (Борис Беговић; born 1956) is an economic scholar in Serbia who has written and spoken on economic problems in the Balkans.  

Begović has written a number of papers for the Centre for Liberal-Democratic Studies.

References

20th-century Serbian economists
Living people
1956 births
Place of birth missing (living people)
Date of birth missing (living people)
People from Belgrade
21st-century Serbian economists
Yugoslav economists